Kanae (written: , , ,  or ) is a Japanese given name generally given to girls. Notable people with the name include:

, Japanese ice hockey player
, Japanese tennis player
Kanae Ikehata (born 1982), Japanese fencer
, Japanese voice actress and singer
, Japanese serial killer
, Japanese voice actress
, Japanese singer and voice actress
Kanae Yagi, Japanese weightlifter
, Japanese politician
, Japanese idol, singer and actress
, Japanese VTuber affiliated with Nijisanji

Fictional characters
, character in the manga series Elfen Lied
, character in the manga series Skip Beat!
, character in the animated film 5 Centimeters Per Second
Kanae, character in the game Akatsuki Blitzkampf
Kanae Aira, character in the book and anime Juni Taisen: Zodiac War
Kanae, a character from the PlayStation 2 horror video game Forbidden Siren 2
, character in the manga and anime Kimetsu no Yaiba

Japanese feminine given names